Lalaland is an Amsterdam-Based Dutch tech startup that creates artificial intelligence based virtual models for e-commerce.

History 
The startup was co-founded in 2019 by Michael Musandu and Ugnius Rimsa. Lalaland states that the concept of creating AI based synthetic, full-body virtual supermodels is aimed to replace the traditional human models to reduce cost to vendors and to increase diversity in product representation.

In April 2020, Lalaland received a pre-seed funding from Amsterdam-based venture capital fund ASIF Ventures. In May 2020,  Lalaland won the 15th Philips Innovation Award. In June 2021, the startup received €350.000 funding from Google under its program to fund the ventures initiated by the people of color.

In January 2022, Lalaland won the  Tommy Hilfiger Fashion Frontier Challenge, which includes a prize of €100,000 and mentorship opportunities.

In June 2022 Lalaland raised €2.1M in a new pre-Series-A round of funding.

References 

Technology companies established in 2019